Tolna is a district in eastern part of Tolna County. Tolna is also the name of the town where the district seat is found. The district is located in the Southern Transdanubia Statistical Region.

Geography 
Tolna District borders with Paks District to the north, Kalocsa District (Bács-Kiskun County) to the east, Szekszárd District to the south and west. The number of the inhabited places in Tolna District is 4.

Municipalities 
The district has 1 town, 1 large village and 2 villages.
(ordered by population, as of 1 January 2013)

The bolded municipality is city, italics municipality is large village.

See also
List of cities and towns in Hungary

References

External links
 Postal codes of the Tolna District

Districts in Tolna County